The Memorial Acclamation is an acclamation sung or recited by the people after the institution narrative of the Eucharist. They were common in ancient eastern liturgies and have more recently been introduced into Roman Catholic, Anglican, Lutheran, and Methodist liturgies.

Liturgy of St James 

The Liturgy of St James is the principal liturgy of the Syriac Orthodox Church, Syriac Catholic Church, Syro-Malankara Catholic Church, Maronite Church, and Malankara Orthodox Church. It is also occasionally used in the Eastern Orthodox Church and Melkite Catholic Church and other Eastern Catholic Churches of Byzantine Rite.

In the Syriac form of this liturgy, after the Words of Institution, to which the people respond with "Amen" after the formula for the blessing of the bread and again after the formula for the blessing of the chalice, the priest celebrant says: "Do in remembrance of Me when you partake of this sacrament, commemorating My death and My resurrection until I come." The people then respond with the acclamation: "Your death, our Lord, we commemorate, Your resurrection we confess and Your second coming we wait for. May Your mercy be upon us all."

In the Byzantine form of the Liturgy of St James, the priest celebrant says: "This do in remembrance of me; for as often as ye eat this bread, and drink this cup, ye do show forth the Lord's death, and confess His resurrection, till He comes." The people respond: "We show forth Thy death, O Lord, and confess Thy resurrection."

Roman Rite 
The Memorial Acclamation was introduced into the Roman Rite of Mass in 1969 as part of the revision of the Roman Missal by Pope Paul VI. Previously the only acclamations by the people in the eucharistic prayer were the Sanctus and the Amen to the final doxology.

The three acclamations 

The three acclamations given in the Roman Missal are, in the official English translation, as follows:

The initial edition of the Roman Missal in English, which in part was a more dynamic rather than literal translation of the original, had instead the following four acclamations:
 Christ has died, Christ is risen, Christ will come again.
 Dying you destroyed our death, rising you restored our life.  Lord Jesus, come in glory.
 When we eat this bread and drink this cup, we proclaim your death, Lord Jesus, until you come in glory.
 Lord, by your cross and resurrection, you have set us free. You are the Saviour of the world.

Mysterium fidei 

As a lead to the Memorial Acclamation, the priest says or sings: "The mystery of faith".

This introductory phrase, mysterium fidei in the Latin original, was previously translated loosely into English as "Let us proclaim the mystery of faith", and in some places was sung or spoken by the deacon instead of the priest in spite of the clear instruction in the Missal itself and in the apostolic constitution Missale Romanum with which Pope Paul VI promulgated the revision of the Roman Missal. The English translation was corrected in 2011 and now reads simply: "The mystery of faith".

Mysterium fidei in the Tridentine Mass 

Before the 1969 revision of the Roman Missal, the phrase mysterium fidei was included in the formula of consecration of the wine spoken inaudibly by the priest, appearing as follows (here accompanied by an unofficial English translation):

Text (in Latin)

Simili modo postquam cenatum est,
accipiens et hunc praeclarum calicem
in sanctas ac venerabiles manus suas:
item tibi gratias agens, benedixit,
deditque discipulis suis, dicens:
Accipite, et bibite ex eo omnes.
Hic est enim calix sanguinis mei,
novi et aeterni testamenti:
mysterium fidei:
qui pro vobis et pro multis effundetur
in remissionem peccatorum.
Haec quotiescumque feceritis,
in mei memoriam facietis.

Unofficial English translation

In like manner, after He had supped,
taking also into His holy and venerable hands
this goodly chalice,
again giving thanks to Thee, He blessed it,
and gave it to His disciples, saying:
Take and drink ye all of this:
For this is the chalice of My blood,
of the new and eternal testament:
the mystery of faith:
which will be shed for you and for many
unto the remission of sins.
As often as ye shall do these things,
ye shall do them in remembrance of me.

Some traditionalist Catholics have criticised the removal of the phrase mysterium fidei from the words of consecration.

Meaning of the phrase mysterium fidei in context 

The phrase mysterium fidei was added to the words of consecration at some time before the 6th century, perhaps by Pope Leo I (440-461) and perhaps, in reaction to the denial by Manichaeism of the goodness of material things, as an expression of the Catholic Church's belief that salvation comes through Christ's material blood and through participation in the sacrament, which makes use of a material element.

The memorial acclamations that follow suggest that "the mystery of faith" refers, in its new context, to "the entire mystery of salvation through Christ's death, resurrection and ascension, which is made present in the celebration of the Eucharist". An alternative memorial acclamation permitted in Ireland, "My Lord and my God", was disapproved of by Pope Paul VI for seemingly concentrating on the real presence of Christ in the Eucharist rather than on Eucharistic sacrifice as a whole, but even this may be interpreted in the same sense, since it is a repetition of what in  refers to Christ as risen and as still bearing the marks of his suffering.<ref name=McNamara>[http://www.zenit.org/en/articles/the-mystery-of-faith Edward McNamara, "The Mystery of Faith" in ZENIT News Agency, 7 October 2014]</ref>

Other liturgies

In its 1979 version of the Book of Common Prayer, the Episcopal Church (United States) has in Prayer B the acclamation:

In three of its Rite 2 eucharistic prayers, the acclamation is made by celebrant and people together.

The Book of Alternative Services'' of the Anglican Church of Canada has a Memorial Acclamation, as have some United Methodist churches.

Lutherans also have an acclamation.

See also

References 

Eucharist